Cautleya gracilis is a perennial herbaceous plant in the family Zingiberaceae (the gingers). It is found in the Himalayas through to south China and Vietnam. It is cultivated as an ornamental garden plant, hardy to a few degrees of frost.

Description

What appear to be stems in Cautleya species are actually "pseudostems" formed by the tightly wrapped bases or sheaths of the leaves. The inflorescence is a spike, with typically 2–10 loosely spaced flowers in C. gracilis var. gracilis and 15–20 more tightly spaced flowers making a compact "head" in C. gracilis var. robusta.

Each yellow or orange flower has a complex structure. Inside the calyx, the three petals are fused at the base to form a tube which is longer than the calyx, so that it protrudes. Inside the petals are three petal-like structures (staminodes). The two side staminodes are upright. The lip or labellum is bent downwards and is divided into two at the tip. The single stamen has a two-pronged "spur" at base of the anther, formed by connective tissue.

The seed capsule is red when ripe, splitting to reveal the black seeds. A small white aril is present in  C. gracilis var. robusta but is absent in C. gracilis var. gracilis.

Taxonomy
Cautleya gracilis was first described by James Edward Smith in 1822 as a Roscoea, R. gracilis. It was transferred to Cautleya by Dandy in 1932.  The genus name honours Proby Cautley, who was responsible for extensive irrigation works in India under the British Raj. The specific epithet, gracilis, means "thin, slender, graceful". Cautleya lutea, first described in 1839 as Roscoea lutea, and Cautleya cathcartii, first described in 1890, are now regarded as synonyms in whole or part of C. gracilis.

Two varieties are recognized:

 Cautleya gracilis var. gracilis (syn. C. lutea (Royle) Hook.f.) – usually fewer than 10 flowers in a loose spike, bracts covering less than 2/3 of the calyx
 Cautleya gracilis var. robusta (K.Schum.) Sanjappa (syns C. lutea var. robusta K.Schum., C. cathcartii Baker) – usually more than 10 flowers in a dense spike, bracts covering 2/3 of the calyx

Cultivation

Cautleya gracilis is cultivated as an ornamental garden plant. It is hardy outdoors in the midlands of England, where a covering mulch is recommended in the winter. It requires a moisture-retentive, humus-rich soil, out of the full sun.

Several collections of the type variety, C. gracilis var. gracilis, are in cultivation. The BWJ 7843 form has wider leaves (to ) and primrose yellow flowers.

C. gracilis var. robusta is also cultivated. It usually has between 15 and 20 flowers, orange or bright yellow in colour.

References

Bibliography

Zingiberoideae
Plants described in 1822